Deutsche Schule Alamogordo was a German international school in Alamogordo, New Mexico. It was operated by the German government and was the largest such school not operated within Germany. Most of the students had parents in the German Air Force stationed at Holloman Air Force Base. It had multiple educational tracks seen in education in Germany.

History
It opened circa 1996.

In 1997 it had grades 1–4. By 2003 it had grades 1–10, and that year it had 180 students. In 2016 it had 140 students and Torsten Reinecke was the principal. As the German military was scheduled to leave Holloman Air Base in 2019, the school was to close then. Upon the school's closing in 2019 the facility became the Imago Dei School. Imago Dei Academy, a Christian school, formally opened its current campus on August 2, 2019.

References

Further reading
  - Image gallery
 
  - Video

External links
 
 Alamogordo German School Storage Addition - White Sands Construction

Public elementary schools in New Mexico
Public middle schools in New Mexico
Public high schools in New Mexico
Alamogordo, New Mexico
1996 establishments in New Mexico
Educational institutions established in 1996
2019 disestablishments in New Mexico
Educational institutions disestablished in 2019
German international schools in the United States